Anas chathamica, the  Chatham duck or  Chatham Island duck is an extinct species of duck, formerly placed in a monotypic genus Pachyanas, which once lived in New Zealand's Chatham Islands in the south-west Pacific Ocean.  It was described by Walter Oliver (as a "stoutly built duck") from bird bones in the collection of the Canterbury Museum in 1955 in the second edition of his work New Zealand Birds. Recently, analysis of mitochondrial DNA extracted from subfossil remains showed that the Chatham duck was not, in fact, closely related to shelducks but instead belongs in the genus Anas: the dabbling ducks. Its closest living relatives appear to be the Auckland teal, Campbell teal and the brown teal from New Zealand. Some authors have suggested that the Chatham duck was flightless; however, comparison of Chatham duck wing bones with those from living ducks indicates no disproportional reduction in wing length. The Chatham duck likely became extinct in about the 16th century because of hunting by humans.

References

External links
 Chatham Island Duck  Pachyanas chathamica by Paul Martinson. Artwork produced for the book Extinct Birds of New Zealand, by Alan Tennyson, Te Papa Press, Wellington, 2006

Ducks
Extinct flightless birds
Extinct birds of the Chatham Islands
Bird extinctions since 1500
Birds described in 1955
Fossil taxa described in 1955
Anatinae